(), also known as the , is a Twelver Shi'ite work of biographical evaluation originally written by Muhammad ibn Umar al-Kashshi ( 854–941/951) and abridged by Shaykh Tusi (995–1067 CE).

Al-Kashshi's original work is now lost. The reason given by Tusi to abridge al-Kashshi's work is that it contained many errors. The abridged work as extant today contains 1115 hadiths and refers to 515 companions of the Shi'ite Imams.

It is one of the four books of Shi'ite biographical evaluation which are regarded as authoritative in Twelver Shi'ism.

Title
The "Men" in the title refers to early transmitters of hadith and other historical figures who knew the Shi'ite Imams. It is also sometimes called  ("al-Kashshi's Men"), to point to al-Kashshi's original authorship.

Content
The work deals with the biographical evaluation of a wide variety of early Muslim figures. Though most of these figures are early Shi'ite hadith transmitters, it also covers other contemporaries of the Shi'ite Imams, as well as a number of people who were not considered to be particularly reliable or praiseworthy. The biographies are organized according to the central Muslim figures to whom the subjects of the biographies were companions, thus starting with the companions of the prophet Muhammad and ending with the companions of Hasan al-Askari (the 11th Imam according to Twelver Shia tradition) and some of the scholars from the time of the Minor Occultation.

See also

 Ahmad ibn Ali al-Najashi (c. 982–1058), author of a similar work called the 
 Qamus al-Rijal (book)
 Al-Kamal fi Asma' al-Rijal
 Usd al-ghabah fi marifat al-Saḥabah
 Biographical evaluation
 Eʿteqādātal-Emāmīya
 The intellectual and political life of Shia Imams
 Atlas of Shia
 History of Islamic Iran
 Political History of Islam
 Reflection on the Ashura movement

References

External links
 Muhammad b. 'Umar al-Kashshi
 Kashshi
 Editions for 'Ikhtiyār maʻrifat al-rijāl al-maʻrūf bi Rijāl al-Kashshī
 The Occultation of the Twelfth Imam
 al-Rijal : Bio-Bibliographical Books and Literatures
 An Investigation of Ikhtiyar Ma,rifat-ual-Rijal

Books about Islam
Ilm ar-Rijal
Books of Rijal
Books of Shia Rijal
Hadith collections
11th-century books
Religious biographical dictionaries